The 2012 Individual Speedway World Championship Grand Prix Qualification were a series of motorcycle speedway meetings used to determine the three riders who qualified for the 2012 Speedway Grand Prix. The top eight riders finishing the 2011 Grand Prix series automatically qualified for 2012. The final round of qualification – the Grand Prix Challenge – took place on 20 August 2011, in Vetlanda, Sweden.

Qualifying rounds

Race-offs

Grand Prix Challenge 
20 August 2011
 Vetlanda, Jönköping County
Referee:  Marek Wojaczek
Jury President:  Wolfgang Glas
References

See also 
 2011 Speedway Grand Prix

References 

2012

World Individual